Hugo Fernando Lucas Gaspar (born 2 September 1982) is a Portuguese volleyball player who plays for Benfica and the Portugal national team. He became the Best Scorer at the second 2008 Olympic Qualification Tournament in Espinho, where Portugal ended up in second place and missed qualification for the 2008 Summer Olympics in Beijing, China.

Honours
Sisley Treviso
Italian Volleyball League: 2004-05

Vitória Guimarães
Portuguese First Division: 2007–08
Portuguese Cup: 2008–09

Castelo da Maia
Portuguese Cup: 2009-10

Benfica
Portuguese First Division: 2012–13, 2013–14, 2014–15, 2016–17, 2018–19
Portuguese Cup: 2010–11, 2011–12, 2014–15, 2015–16, 2017–18, 2018–19
Portuguese Super Cup: 2011, 2012, 2013, 2014, 2015, 2016, 2018, 2019

Portugal
2002 World Championship – 8th place
2008 Olympic Qualification Tournament – 2nd place (did not qualify)

External links
 Benfica official profile 
 FIVB biography

1982 births
Living people
People from Marinha Grande
Portuguese men's volleyball players
S.L. Benfica volleyball players
Sportspeople from Leiria District